Alexei Sergeevich Tsvetkov (March 17, 1924, Bukarevo (Tver Province), Soviet Russia – June 28, 2009, Moscow, Russian Federation) was a Russian sculptor (animal painter), Honored Artist of Russian Federation, who lived and worked in Moscow. His sculptures reside in State Russian Museum, State Tretyakov Gallery, in art museums and private collections in Russia and other countries of the world.

Biography 
Alexei Sergeevich Tsvetkov was born March 17, 1924, in the family of a peasant called Sergei Tsvetkov in the village of Bukarevo in Tver Province. Wounded and lost a leg on active service in the Second World War (1941–45). Studied at the Vera Mukhina School of Art and Industry in Leningrad (1945–50). Lived in Moscow (from 1952). Contributed to exhibitions (from 1958). Alexey Tsvetkov is called "the master of the wood", as he keeps this material live in his works. That is why his beasties look so alive and very Russian, thanks to the artist’s Russian background: Alexey grown up and absorbed the spirit of a Russian village. His sculptures reside in State Russian Museum, State Tretyakov Gallery, in art museums and private collections in Russia and other countries of the world. He has created more than 300 sculptures.

External links  
 Alexei Sergeevich Tsvetkov (1924-2009)
 Bestiary – from shape to image
 Alexei Tsvetkov
 Tsvetkov Alexei Sergeevich
 History of wood carving

1924 births
20th-century Russian painters
Russian male painters
Soviet painters
Artists from Moscow
Honored Artists of the Russian Federation
Animal artists
20th-century Russian sculptors
20th-century Russian male artists
Russian male sculptors
21st-century Russian painters
2009 deaths
21st-century Russian male artists